Beyond Eyes is an adventure game developed by Tiger & Squid and published by Team17.

Gameplay
The game showcases how a ten-year-old girl named Rae, who has lost her sight due to an accident with fireworks, interacts with the world around her. The world initially appears to be all white, but certain objects are highlighted when Rae touches them. Sound is an important element of the game, giving the player an idea of where certain objects are located. Challenges include deciding if the sound of cars is distant enough to safely cross the road. Beyond Eyes fits into a genre of walking simulator games that tell a story, and much like a blind person must memorise their environment, the game tries to show how sound memory for a blind person feels.

Development
The game was developed by Sherida Halatoe's Tiger & Squid in collaboration with Team17. It was shown to the international press for the first time at the annual Game Developers Conference 2015. It failed to reach its crowdfunding goal on Indiegogo. Tiger & Squid are believed to be, a real cat also portrayed in the game, and a stuffed toy.

Reception

Beyond Eyes received mixed reviews. Aggregating review websites GameRankings and Metacritic gave the Microsoft Windows version 65.17% based on 6 reviews and 60/100 based on 11 reviews, the Xbox One version 63.19% based on 16 reviews and 60/100 based on 24 reviews and the PlayStation 4 version 59.29% based on 7 reviews and 52/100 based on 7 reviews.

References

External links
Official website
@tigerandsquid on twitter

2015 video games
Adventure games
Indie video games
Indiegogo projects
Linux games
MacOS games
PlayStation 4 games
Video games developed in the Netherlands
Video games featuring female protagonists
Windows games
Xbox One games
Team17 games